"Breathe" is a song by Australian singer Ricki-Lee Coulter from her self-titled debut album, Ricki-Lee (2005). It was released both physically and digitally on 9 January 2006 as the third and final single from the album. "Breathe" peaked at number 14 on the ARIA Singles Chart. The music video was directed by Bart Borghesi and filmed in Port Melbourne, Victoria.

Background and release
"Breathe" was written by Russ Ballard, Christian Ballard, Sara Eker, Lucy Abbott, Dawn Joseph and Andrew Murray, while the production was helmed by Audius. The song was released as a CD single and digital extended play (EP) on 9 January 2006 as the third and final single from Coulter's self-titled debut album, Ricki-Lee. "Breathe" debuted on the ARIA Singles Chart at number 17 on 16 January 2006 and peaked at number 14 the following week.

Track listings
 CD single
 "Breathe" (radio edit) – 3:32
 "Sunshine" (Cabin Crew remix radio edit) – 3:34
 "Sunshine" (Cabin Crew remix extended mix) – 5:19
 "Breathe" (instrumental) – 3:32

 Digital EP
 "Breathe" (radio edit) – 3:32
 "Sunshine" (Cabin Crew remix radio edit) – 3:34
 "Sunshine" (Cabin Crew remix extended mix) – 5:19
 "Breathe" (instrumental) – 3:32
 "Breathe" (Killer Kitty remix) – 3:41

 Limited-edition digital EP
 "Breathe" (radio edit) – 3:32
 "Sunshine" (acoustic) – 3:43
 "Hell No!" (acoustic) – 3:36
 "Breathe" (acoustic) – 3:50

Credits and personnel
Credits are adapted from the liner notes of Ricki-Lee: The Singles.

Locations
 Mixed at Sing Sing Studios
 Mastered at Crystal Mastering

Personnel
 Songwriting – Russ Ballard, Christian Ballard, Sara Eker, Lucy Abbott, Dawn Joseph, Andrew Murray
 Production – Audius
 Mixing – Andy Baldwin
 Mastering – John Ruberto

Charts

Weekly chart

Year-end chart

Release history

References

2005 songs
2006 singles
Ricki-Lee Coulter songs
Shock Records singles
Song recordings produced by Audius Mtawarira
Songs written by Christian Ballard (songwriter)
Songs written by Russ Ballard